Seryshevsky District  is an administrative and municipal district (raion), one of the twenty in Amur Oblast, Russia. Its administrative center is the urban locality (a work settlement) of Seryshevo. Population:  29,440 (2002 Census);  The population of Seryshevo accounts for 42.0% of the district's population.

References

Notes

Sources

Districts of Amur Oblast